Lepetodriloidea is a superfamily of small to large sea snails, hydrothermal vent limpets, marine gastropod mollusks in the clade Vetigastropoda.

Families 
Families within the superfamily Lepetodriloidea include:
Family Lepetodrilidae McLean, 1988
Family Sutilizonidae McLean, 1989
Families brought into synonymy
 Clypeosectidae McLean, 1989: synonym of Lepetodrilidae
 Gorgoleptidae: synonym of Lepetodrilidae

References 

Vetigastropoda